This is a list of Ministers of the Interior of France.

Ministers of the Interior (1790–present)

See also
List of prime ministers of France
List of foreign ministers of France
Politics of France

Lists of government ministers of France
French interior ministers